Dogielinotidae is a family of amphipods. It is subdivided into three subfamilies, containing a total of twelve genera:
Dogielinotinae Gurjanova, 1953
Allorchestes Dana, 1849
Dogielinoides Bousfield, 1982
Dogielinotus Gurjanova, 1953
Eohaustorioides Bousfield & Tzvetkova, 1982
Exhyalella Stebbing, 1917
Haustorioides Oldevig, 1958
Marinohyalella Lazo-Wasem & Gable, 2001
Parhyalella Kunkel, 1910
Proboscinotus Bousfield, 1982
Hyalellinae Bulycheva, 1957
Hyalella Smith, 1874
Najniinae Barnard, 1972
?Insula Kunkel, 1910
Najna Derzhavin, 1937

References

Gammaridea
Crustacean families